Apantesis fergusoni is a moth of the  family Erebidae. It was described by Schmidt in 2009. It is found in the central Sierra
Nevada and White Mountains of California. The habitat consists of subalpine and alpine areas.

The length of the forewings is 14.4 mm for males and 17.7 mm for females. The ground colour of the forewings is dark chocolate brown. The hindwings are bright pinkish-orange with a black pattern. Adults are on wing from mid July to August.

This species was formerly a member of the genus Grammia, but was moved to Apantesis along with the other species of the genera Grammia, Holarctia, and Notarctia.

Etymology
The species is named in honour of Douglas C. Ferguson.

References

 Natural History Museum Lepidoptera generic names catalog

Arctiina
Moths described in 2009